Sardar Jogendra Singh (3 October 1903 – 11 February 1979) was an Indian politician who served as governor of Rajasthan from 1972 to 1977, and was also a member of the 2nd Lok Sabha.

References

1903 births
1979 deaths
India MPs 1957–1962
Governors of Rajasthan
Indian independence activists from Uttar Pradesh
Indian socialists
Lok Sabha members from Uttar Pradesh
Members of the Constituent Assembly of India
People from Bahraich
Prisoners and detainees of British India
Indian National Congress politicians from Rajasthan
Indian National Congress politicians from Uttar Pradesh